Lady Elliot Island is the southernmost coral cay of the Great Barrier Reef, Australia. It is part of the Capricorn and Bunker Group of islands and is owned by the Commonwealth of Australia. The island is home to a small eco resort and an airstrip, which is serviced daily by flights from Bundaberg, Hervey Bay, Brisbane and the Gold Coast.

Lady Elliot Island is located within the 'Green Zone' of the Great Barrier Reef Marine Park, which is the highest possible classification designated by the Great Barrier Reef Marine Park Authority. Marine National Park Green Zones protect the biodiversity within the Great Barrier Reef Marine Park by protecting important breeding and nursery areas such as seagrass beds, mangrove communities, deepwater shoals and reefs.

The island is particularly renowned for its scuba diving and snorkelling, as its location far offshore at the southern end of the Great Barrier Reef results in excellent water clarity.

Flora

The island is a vegetated shingle cay, which is uncommon. Typically these type of cays are too narrow to retain fresh water or too mobile for vegetation to take hold.  Pisonia grandis grows on the island.

Fauna
The waters surrounding the island are particularly rich in sealife because of a total ban on fishing or taking anything from the surrounding waters. Manta rays are abundant, attracted to the plankton around the island. The speckled carpetshark is often observed in the waters around the island.

Turtles
The Great Barrier Reef is one of the most important sea turtle habitats in the world, with Lady Elliot Island being a key part of that habitat. Every year between November and March the green and loggerhead turtles lumber up the same beach on which they were born more than 50 years ago. These turtles nest on Lady Elliot Island up to nine times in a season, laying between 80 and 120 eggs per clutch. About eight to twelve weeks later, young hatchlings leave their nests and head towards the ocean (January to April).

Whales
Lady Elliot Island is just north of Hervey Bay, a popular humpback whale resting ground along their migration route. Whales are common in the waters around the island in the winter and early spring from June to October. Regular sightings occur on the flights to the island, and while snorkelling and diving from boats and from the island's beaches.  Almost daily during the season, whale songs can be heard under the water while swimming around the island.

Birds
Lady Elliot Island has one of the highest seabird diversity of any island within the Great Barrier Reef. The Capricorn silvereye, a small bird endemic to the southern Great Barrier Reef, is found on the island, which is also home to the buff-banded rail.  It is an important seabird nesting site. The cay is a haven for over fifty species of tropical seabirds and wading birds. Over 100,000 birds nest on Lady Elliot Island during summer breeding season.

Seabirds that nest on Lady Elliot Island include:
 Brown booby
 Lesser frigatebird
 Terns: black-naped, bridled, crested, roseate, sooty
 Black noddy
 Red-tailed tropicbird
 Silver gull
 Wedge-tailed shearwater
 Pacific reef heron

History

Origin
Lady Elliot Island first appeared above sea level around 1500 BC as a coral rubble spit.  It developed into a mature coral cay over the next 3,000 years.  Lady Elliot had endured because bird droppings have hardened together with beach sediments into beachrock. The existence of concentric shingle ridges across the island provides evidence of its formation by progradation over several millennia as deposits were laid down during episodic storms.

First commercial venture
In 1805, first commercial venture on Lady Elliot Island was the collecting of bêche-de-mer. These animals were removed from the shallow water, dried and then smoked before being exported to South-East Asia. The industry petered out when there were no more sea cucumbers.

British discovery

In 1816, the island was officially "discovered" and named by Captain Thomas Stewart aboard the vessel Lady Elliot. on the way to Sydney in 1816.
 The Lady Elliot was a 353-tonne vessel that was built in Bengal and registered in Calcutta, India. On the return journey from Sydney, it was wrecked on a reef south of Cardwell in North Queensland, and that reef is called Lady Elliot Reef.

The ship was probably named after Anna Maria Elliot, the wife of Gilbert Elliot-Murray-Kynynmound, 1st Earl of Minto, a Scottish politician who was Governor-General of India between 1807 and 1813.  Anna Maria (later Lady Elliot) was the daughter of Sir George Amyand, 1st Baronet. An alternative story suggests that it was named after Margaret, wife of Gilbert's brother, Hugh Elliot, a diplomat and Governor of Madras from September 1814 to June 1820. However, Hugh Elliot's wife was not a "Lady", as he was a career diplomat, was not knighted and did not inherit any titles of nobility.

Mining for guano
In 1863, Mr J. Askunas won tender from the Queensland Government to mine the island for guano for 300 pounds per annum for 10 years. The lease was transferred to Dr W.I. Crowther of Hobart on 23 August 1864. Dr Crowther mined the island until the end of 1873. The guano was mined by Chinese and Malay workers and sent to mainland Australia and New Zealand. Over this period virtually all the trees were removed, as well as 3 feet of top soil and guano. In 1874, the guano mining ceased, but the damage to the vegetation of the island was absolute. It was not until 1966 that a revegetation program was undertaken by lighthouse staff. Their efforts were quickly rewarded, with the island re-emerging as a haven for all types of seabirds.

Lighthouse

The first lighthouse to be built on the island was constructed in 1866. It was the third lighthouse built in Queensland and the first to be built offshore on the Great Barrier Reef. The original structure was destroyed by a cyclone six years later. In 1873, another lighthouse was constructed, Lady Elliot Island Light. The lighthouse is on the National Heritage list because it is a timber-framed construction with a cast iron cladding, which was premade in England and shipped to the island in pieces. The old lighthouse was used continuously until 1995 but became too short for the surrounding vegetation, which was interrupting the beam of light. At this time the Australian Maritime Safety Authority built a new light tower. It is solar powered, fully automated and runs continuously.
The original lighthouse was placed on the Commonwealth Heritage List in 2004. The Lady Elliot Island Lightstation Heritage Management Plan was developed by the Great Barrier Reef Marine Park Authority (GBRMPA) in March 2012 to protect, conserve and manage the Commonwealth Heritage values of the Lady Elliot Island lighthouse.

Airstrip and resort

In 1969, Don Adams (who later went on to found Seabird Aviation) built an airstrip and accommodation on the island, and was granted a tourist recreation lease by the Australian Government. In 1977, Don Adams sold the lease to Barrier Reef Airways. In 1984, the Australian Government called for tenders to construct a low-key resort on that island. The first owner of the resort lease was John and Judy French, with the resort opening in 1985. In 1992, the resort lease changed hands and was sold to Bevan Whittaker. Guided activities on the island include reef walking, glass bottom boat/guided snorkel tours, island history tours, bird watching tours and turtle treks in season.

In 2005, the original 20-year resort lease came up for renewal and was put to tender. The tender was won by three Gold Coast businessmen—Peter Gash, Grant Kenny and Michael Kyle. A new lease was granted for a 10-year period, with two options each for a further term of ten years. Since the change of lessee, a program to progressively renovate the island's facilities and make them more ecologically friendly has been implemented. The Lady Elliot Island Eco Resort Management team is dedicated to the preservation of the natural environment of the Great Barrier Reef, with their goal to work in harmony with nature for the benefit of future generations.

Lady Elliot Island Eco Resort has introduced a range of environmental best-practice measures, including construction of a hybrid solar power station to reduce energy consumption and carbon emissions. Lady Elliot Island Eco Resort has also achieved the highest level of ECO Certification program 'ECO Certified – Advanced Ecotourism' with Ecotourism Australia. Tourist services to the island are provided by Seair Pacific.

Climate
Lady Elliot island has a tropical savanna climate (Aw).

See also

 List of islands of Australia

References

External links

Islands on the Great Barrier Reef
Central Queensland
Places in the Great Barrier Reef Marine Park